"Sirius" is an instrumental by British rock band the Alan Parsons Project, recorded for their sixth studio album, Eye in the Sky (1982). Nearly two minutes long, it segues into "Eye in the Sky" on the original recording. From the 1990s onward, "Sirius" has become a staple of many college and professional sporting events throughout North America, most prominently Chicago Bulls games.

Overview 
On the album, "Sirius" segues into "Eye in the Sky". The former is usually followed by the latter on airplay, though not always in live performances — at the World Liberty Concert Sirius was played as the introduction to "Breakaway" (from the Alan Parsons solo album Try Anything Once), with Candy Dulfer on saxophone.

Background 
The genesis of "Sirius" began when Alan Parsons wanted the first song on the album to be "Eye in the Sky", but felt there needed to be an introduction leading up to it. As he was working on ideas at home on his Fairlight CMI, he wrote a riff that he liked, which ultimately became "Sirius". This riff was played using a clavinet sample with added tape delay. Originally, "Sirius" was not written in the same key as "Eye in the Sky", but was re-recorded in the studio once the band realized it would lead into "Eye in the Sky" well.

Usage in media

Sports 
Ricky "The Dragon" Steamboat used an abbreviated version of "Sirius" as his entrance music during the 1980s in his tenures with WWE and in Jim Crockett Promotions/World Championship Wrestling (NWA).

"Sirius" is best known in the U.S. as the instrumental song that was used to introduce the starting lineup of the Chicago Bulls for home games at both Chicago Stadium and the United Center during their run of six NBA championships from 1984 to 2004.  The song was chosen by public address announcer Tommy Edwards after he heard it playing in a local movie theater two years after the song's release in 1982. Since 2006, a version arranged by Ethan Stoller and Kaotic Drumline's Jamie Poindexter has been used. "Sirius" was the opening number of the 2000 documentary Michael Jordan to the Max. The piece has also been used by the NBA teams the Phoenix Suns and the Milwaukee Bucks to introduce their starting lineup during home games. Since the 1994 season, "Sirius" has played before the Nebraska Cornhuskers' home football games as part of the pre-game tunnel walk. The Kansas City Chiefs used the song during kickoffs during the Coach Marty Schottenheimer era (which lasted from 1989 to 1998), and still occasionally use it. It was used by the New Orleans Saints in 2009 as their entrance music for Super Bowl XLIV. It is also used by the World of Outlaws before the cars do the four-wide salute during parade laps before the A Main feature.

In Italy, Serie A team Sassuolo use the song when the team enters the pitch at the home games. In France, Ligue 2 team AS Nancy uses the song to introduce their starting players before home games. In Israel, IBPL team Maccabi Tel Aviv uses it to introduce the home team starting lineup before EuroLeague games. In Australia the piece is used by the Melbourne Rebels rugby team when introducing their starting lineup, as well as the Perth Wildcats basketball team.  The song was played leading up to matches at UEFA Euro 2012, and France's tennis team used the song as their entrance theme for the 2014 Davis Cup final against Switzerland. The song was used during finals at the 2013 World Artistic Gymnastics Championships in Antwerp, Belgium. It was played while the gymnasts were introduced to the crowd at the beginning of the finals.

It was used as an intro song by the Swiss national football team at the Euro 2020. It was also used as the walkout song for AnEsonGib before his fight against Tayler Holder for the Battle of the Platforms.

The German handball team SC Magdeburg use the song to introduce their squad.

Film, television, and video games 
"Sirius" is played during the climactic scene of the 1988 Godfrey Ho film American Commando 3: Savage Temptation. It’s also played in John Hamburg’s 1998 debut movie Safe Men, as a stolen Stanley Cup rises out of the dance floor at Bernie (Little Big Fat) Gale's Bar Mitzvah. "Sirius" is used as incidental music in the 1990 Mexican telenovela Cuando llega el amor. "Sirius" is played in the 8th-season episode of Frasier, "Hooping Cranes," during a sequence where Niles Crane shoots and scores from half-court at KeyArena. The music makes a brief appearance in the 2015 Simpsons episode "Friend With Benefit".

On UK TV it is played in the background when a participant is taking part in a record breaking challenge on BBC's "Roy Castle's Record Breakers"

In recent years, the song has been used in the trailer for Anchorman 2: The Legend Continues, in the film Cloudy with a Chance of Meatballs, and was played in a Nissan Altima TV advertisement. It is featured on the soundtracks to NBA 2K11, which is used in the Michael Jordan intro, and a remixed version of the song is used in NBA 2K18. A soundalike version was used in The Adventures of Jimmy Neutron Boy Genius episode "Vanishing Act." It appears in 2017 TV commercials for Best Buy. The 2018 movie Blockers also plays the song. The track appears in series one of the 2018 YouTube Red production Cobra Kai when Johnny Lawrence (William Zabka) tells Miguel Diaz (Xolo Maridueña) "I'm gonna be your sensei."
It was also played at the end of the first episode (and towards the end of the ninth episode) of The Last Dance, a ten-part documentary miniseries by ESPN and Netflix centering around the Chicago Bulls 1997-1998 season, when they won their sixth NBA Championship. The opening guitar arpeggio is similar to that of the track "Corridors of Time" in the progressive rock influenced score for the game Chrono Trigger. The song is heard briefly in Space Jam: A New Legacy, which is a sequel to the original film, during the scene where Sylvester tries to summon Michael Jordan to help the Tune Squad win the game against Al-G Rhythm and the Goon Squad, only to find out that it is the actor Michael B. Jordan instead.

Track listing

Personnel 

 Alan Parsons – clavinet, Fairlight CMI, delay
 Eric Woolfson – keyboards
 Andrew Powell – orchestral arrangement, orchestral conductor
 David Paton – bass guitar
 Ian Bairnson – electric guitars
 Stuart Elliott – drums, percussion

Covers 
 "Sirius" is sampled in "The Saga Continues (Intro)", the opening track of P. Diddy and The Bad Boy Family's 2001 album The Saga Continues. The song is also sampled in "B.O.M.B.S." by Fabolous and "Miami Shit" by Pitbull. 
Armin van Buuren & AVIRA released the new cover in trance version.
"Sirius" was covered along with "Eye in the Sky" by Zombi on their 2022 album "Zombi & Friends, Volume 1".

References

External links
 "Songfacts — Sirius" by The Alan Parsons Project
 

1982 songs
1980s instrumentals
The Alan Parsons Project songs
Songs written by Eric Woolfson
Arista Records singles
Songs written by Alan Parsons
Song recordings produced by Alan Parsons
Rock instrumentals
Chicago Bulls